"Breathe" is the third single recorded by British singer Delilah. The song was released as a digital download single on 7 May 2012 in the United Kingdom from her debut album, From the Roots Up. The song peaked to number 87 on the UK Singles Chart.

Music video
A music video to accompany the release of "Breathe" was first released onto YouTube on 12 April 2012 at a total length of four minutes.

Track listing

An Emalkay remix of the song was used on the trailer to the show Dynamo: Magician Impossible, it was also uploaded on a YouTube channel called UKFDubstep. It has 2.6 million views as of August 2019.

Chart performance

Release history

References

2012 singles
Delilah (musician) songs
Songs written by Delilah (musician)
2012 songs